Events in the year 1919 in India.

Incumbents
 Emperor of India – George V
 Viceroy of India – Frederic Thesiger, 1st Viscount Chelmsford

Events
 National income - 26,966 million
 13 April - Jallianwala Bagh massacre
 15 April – Disturbances in Delhi and Punjab and martial law in Punjab (back dated to 30 March);.
 6 April – Mahatma Gandhi declared an All India Strike against the Rowlatt Act.
 11 April – Serious riots in Ahmedabad.
 13 April – At the Jallianwala Bagh Massacre in Amritsar, Punjab, British and Gurkha troops massacre 379 Sikhs.
 19 November – Jamiat Ulema-e-Hind was formed by a group of Muslim scholars.

Law
 18 March - The British ram the repressive Rowlatt Act through India's Imperial Legislative Council
 23 December - Government of India Act 1919 establishes a dual administration: part Indian and elected, part British and authoritarian.
Poisons Act

Births

January to June
5 January – Hector Abhayavardhana, Sri Lankan political theorist (d. 2012)
14 January – Kaifi Azmi, Urdu poet and Padma Shree (d. 2002)
19 January – Dharam Singh, field hockey player (died 2001).
7 March – M. N. Nambiar, actor (died 2008).
20 May – Jal Cursetji, Indian navy admiral (died 1991)

July to December
18 July – Jayachamaraja Wodeyar, last Maharaja of Mysore, philosopher, musicologist, political thinker and philanthropist (died 1974).
12 August – Vikram Sarabhai, physicist (died 1971).
31 August – Amrita Pritam, poet, novelist and essayist (died 2005).
7 September – Muhammad Ajmal, academic psychologist (died 1994).
 4 December – Inder Kumar Gujral, 13th Prime Minister of India (died 2012).
9 December – E. K. Nayanar, politician and three times Chief Minister of Kerala (died 2004).
16 December – Yadlapati Venkata Rao, politician (died 2022)
25 December – Naushad Ali, musician and composer (died 2006).

Full date unknown
Jamuna Baruah, actress (died 2005).
Pratap Chandra Chunder, Minister, educationalist and author (died 2008).
Mahipal, actor (died 2005).

References

 
India
Years of the 20th century in India